This is a list of compositions by Daron Hagen (born 1961).

Orchestra
 (1982) Andersonville Overture
 (1985) Symphony No. 1
 (1986) Grand Line: a Tribute to Leonard Bernstein
 (1990) Heliotrope
 (1990) Symphony No. 2
 (1991) Philharmonia
 (1992) Fire Music
 (1996) Built Up Dark for strings, winds and brass
 (1997) Postcards from America
 (1998/2010) Symphony No. 3
 (2000) Suddenly
 (2000) Much Ado
 (2001) Advance
 (2003) Susurrus
 (2005) Gesture Drawings
 (2009) Symphony No. 4
 (2009) Northern Lights
 (2010) con gai: a greeting and a farewell
 (2012) Sky Interludes from Amelia
 (2014) Symphony No. 5
 (2017) Chaplin Suite
 (2018) A Chaplin Symphony
 (2019) The Passion of Jekyll and Hyde
 (2021) Bandanna Overture
 (2022) Moviola for large orchestra

String orchestra
 (1981) Prayer for Peace
 (2001) Angels

Orchestra with voice(s)
 (1994) Joyful Music for chorus and orchestra
 (1996) Taliesin: Choruses from Shining Brow for chorus and orchestra
 (1996) Stewards of Your Bounty for chorus and orchestra

Concertante
 (1982) Stanzas for cello and chamber orchestra
 (1994) Concerto for Horn, with Winds and Strings
 (1994) Concerto for Flügelhorn and Wind Ensemble
 (1996) Concerto for Cello and Orchestra
 (1998) Concerto for Cello and Wind Orchestra
 (2001) Concerto for Oboe and String Orchestra
 (2001) Concerto No. 1 for Piano and Orchestra
 (2002) Seven Last Words: concerto for piano LH and orchestra
 (2004) Romeo and Juliet: concerto for flute, cello and orchestra
 (2006) Orpheus and Eurydice: concerto for violin, cello, piano and orchestra
 (2007) Masquerade: concerto for violin, cello and orchestra
 (2010) Genji: concerto for koto and orchestra
 (2011) Songbook: concerto for solo violin, strings, harp, and percussion
 (2015) Concerto No. 2: Chaplin's Tramp: concerto for piano, film, and orchestra

Operas, cantatas, and musicals
 (1984) A Walt Whitman Requiem for chorus and string orchestra
 (1991) Shining Brow (libretto: Paul Muldoon)
 (1997) Vera of Las Vegas (libretto: Paul Muldoon)
 (1997) Songs of Madness and Sorrow (libretto: Daron Hagen)
 (1998) Bandanna (libretto: Paul Muldoon)
 (2000) Light Fantastic (libretto: Daron Hagen)
 (2005) The Antient Concert (libretto: Paul Muldoon)
 (2008) New York Stories (libretto: Barbara Grecki, Daron Hagen)
 consists of three one act operas: Broken Pieces, Just for the Night, and Cradle Song
 (2009) Amelia (libretto: Gardner McFall; story: Stephen Wadsworth)
 (2010) Little Nemo in Slumberland (libretto: J.D. McClatchy)
 (2012) The George Washington Suite (libretto: Rob Handel)
 (2013) A Woman in Morocco (libretto: Barbara Grecki, Daron Hagen, after a play by Barbara Grecki)
 (2014) I Hear America Singing (musical; book, lyrics, and music by Daron Hagen)
 (2018) Orson Rehearsed (multi-media opera; films, libretto, concept, music, and direction by Daron Hagen)
 (2021) 9/10: Love Before the Fall (operafilm; libretto: Daron Hagen)

Songs and song cycles
 (1982) Echo's Songs
 (1984) Three Silent Things for soprano and piano quartet
 (1986) Love Songs
 (1987) Rapture and Regret for soprano, cello and piano
 (1990) Muldoon Songs
 (1991) Dear Youth for soprano, flute and piano
 (1993) Lost in Translation for voice, oboe, cello and harpsichord
 (1996) Merrill Songs
 (1996) Love Scene from Romeo and Juliet for two voices, flute, violin and piano
 (2000) The Heart of the Stranger
 (2000) Love in a Life
 (2000) Phantoms of Myself
 (2001) Figments
 (2001) Larkin Songs
 (2003) Letting Go
 (2004) Sappho Songs for two female voices and cello
 (2007) Songs of Experience
(2009) Four Irish Folk Songs for two voices and piano
 (2010) We Happy Few scena for baritone and piano
 (2011) Vegetable Verselets
 (2011) After Words for two voices and piano
 (2014) Four Dickinson Songs
 (2015) jaik's songs for voice and piano
 (2016) Blake Songs for voice and mixed ensemble, or piano
 (2016) A Handful of Days for soprano and piano
 (2017) Dante Fragments for soprano, violin, and piano
 (2017) On the Beach at Night scena for baritone, cello and piano

 (2019) The Art of Song twenty-three songs for six solo voices and piano
 (2020) Mata Hard Letters for voice and piano
 (2020) Four Songs for Mezzo Soprano and Piano
 (2021) Dante Fragments for tenor, violin, cello, and vibraphone
 (2021) Four Shakespeare Fragments for voice and piano
 (2022) Three Whitman Fragments for voice and string quartet

Mixed chamber ensemble
 (1984) Divertimento for viola, harp, and vibraphone
 (1984) Piano Trio No. 1: Trio Concertante
 (1985) String Quartet No. 1
 (1985) Sonata No. 1 for Flute and Piano
 (1986) Piano Trio No. 2: J'entends
 (1988) The Presence Absence Makes, for flute and string quartet
 (1989) Harp Trio
 (1989) Jot! for clarinet, marimba, and piano
 (1993) Everything Must Go! for brass quintet
 (1994) Music from Shining Brow for brass quintet
 (1995) Concerto for Brass Quintet
 (1996) An Overture to Vera for fourteen instruments
 (1997) Duo for Violin and Cello
 (2000) Serenade for ten instruments
 (2001) Quintet for Oboe and Strings
 (2001) Nocturne for piano and strings
 (2002) Snapshot for string quartet
 (2002) Variant for string quartet
 (2003) Chamber Symphony for thirteen instruments
 (2003) Sonata No. 2 for Flute and Piano
 (2003) String Quartet No. 2: Alive in a Moment for voice and string quartet
 (2006) Piano Trio No. 3: Wayfaring Stranger
 (2007) Piano Trio No. 4: Angel Band
 (2009) Just Amazed for eleven players
 (2010) Book of Days for clarinet, viola and piano
 (2011) Tryst for oboe, bassoon and piano
 (2012) Quiet Heart for violin and piano
 (2012) String Quartet No. 3
 (2013) Early, Later for clarinet and piano
 (2014) Valse Noire for cello and piano
 (2014) Valse Blanche for violin and piano
 (2015) The Heike Quarto: Appassionato for koto and cello
 (2016) The Heike Quarto: Cantabile for koto and cello
 (2017) The Heike Quarto: Misterioso for koto, voice, and cello
 (2017) Sonata for Violoncello and Piano
 (2017) Piano Trio No. 5: Red is the Rose
 (2017) Lilly Sketches for woodwind quintet
 (2017) Piano Trio No. 6: Horszowski
 (2018) The Heike Quarto: Grandioso for koto and cello
 (2019) Swan Song for koto, shamisen, shakuhachi, and string quartet
 (2019) Piano Trio No. 7: Wintergreen
 (2020) Piano Trio No. 8: Pacifica

Solo
 (1984) Suite for Solo Violin
 (1985) Suite for Solo Cello
 (1985) Occasional Notes for organ
 (1986) Suite for Solo Viola
 (1987) Higher, Louder, Faster! for solo cello
 (1999) Qualities of Light for piano
 (2002) Piano Variations
 (2009) Suite for Piano
 (2012) Five Nocturnes for piano
 (2012) Secrets My Mother Told Me for koto
 (2016) Anniversary: in Memoriam Leonard Bernstein for piano
 (2019) Nine Advent Postludes and Preludes for Organ

Choral
(1985) Vägen (SATB)
(1985) The Voice Within (SATB/Pf)
(1989) Little Prayers (SATB)
(1995) The Waking Father (SSATBB)
(1995) The Elephant's Child (SSATBB)
(1997) Gandhi's Children (SA/Handbells)
(1997) Hope (SATB/Pf)
(1998) Silent Night, eight movements for chorus, cello and percussion
(2002) We're All Here three poems for chorus and chamber ensemble (or SATB/Pf)
(2004) I Had Rather (SATB)
(2005) Vertue (SATB/Pf)
(2005) Flight Music song cycle for treble chorus and string quartet
(2006) O, For Such a Dream for soprano solo, mixed chorus, and piano
(2009) Three Celtic Songs  (SSA)
(2015) Hymn of Forgiveness (SATB/Organ)
(2016) I Hear America Singing (SSATB/Pf)

Band and wind ensemble
(1990) Sennets, Cortege, and Tuckets
(1998) Night, Again
(1999) Forward! for brass and percussion
(1999) Bandanna Overture
(2000) Wedding Dances from Bandanna
(2000) Prelude and Prayer from Bandanna
(2007) Agincourt Fanfare for brass and timpani

Live to Film
(2015) Concerto No. 2: Chaplin's Tramp: concerto for piano, film, and orchestra (Film: The Tramp)
 (2017) Chaplin Suite (Film: A Dog's Life)
 (2018) A Chaplin Symphony (Film: City Lights)
 (2018) Orson Rehearsed (multi-media opera; films, libretto, concept, music, and direction by Daron Hagen)
 (2019) The Passion of Jekyll and Hyde (Film: Doctor Jekyll and Mister Hyde)
 (2022) Too Much Johnson (Film: Too Much Johnson)

See also
 Daron Hagen
 :Category:Operas by Daron Hagen

External links
 Catalog of Works from the Official Daron Hagen website

 
Hagen, Daron, compositions by